There are at least 35 named glaciers in Glacier National Park (U.S.). At the end of the Little Ice Age about 1850, the area containing the national park had 150 glaciers. There are 25 active glaciers remaining in the park as of 2022. Since the latest interglacial period began around 10,000 years ago, there have been regular climate shifts causing periods of glacier growth or melt-back. The glaciers are currently being studied to see the effect of global warming. The glaciers in the park have been in a general state of retreat since at least the year 1850, which is oftentimes cited as the end of the Little Ice Age, when mid-latitude glaciers reached their largest historical maximum. Though believed in the early 2000s that most of the glaciers in the park would disappear by the year 2020, more recent studies now give the year 2030 as a more likely date for this disappearance. A study done in 2003 on two glaciers indicated they would be completely gone by the year 2030, though some other glaciers may remain as small isolated ice bodies for a longer duration.

 Agassiz Glacier –  ; 
 Ahern Glacier –  ; 

 Baby Glacier –  ; 
 Blackfoot Glacier – ; 
 Boulder Glacier – ; 
 Carter Glaciers – ; 
 Chaney Glacier – ; 
 Dixon Glacier – ; 
 Gem Glacier – ; 
 Grinnell Glacier – ; 
 Harris Glacier – ; 
 Harrison Glacier – ; 
 Herbst Glacier – ; 
 Hudson Glacier – ; 
 Ipasha Glacier – ; 
 Jackson Glacier – ; 

 Kintla Glacier – ; 
 Logan Glacier – ; 
 Lupfer Glacier – ; 
 Miche Wabun Glacier – ; 
 North Swiftcurrent Glacier – ; 
 Old Sun Glacier – ; 
 Piegan Glacier – ; 
 Pumpelly Glacier – ; 
 Pumpkin Glacier – ; 
 Rainbow Glacier – ; 
 Red Eagle Glacier – ; 
 The Salamander Glacier – ; 
 Sexton Glacier – ; 
 Shepard Glacier – ; 
 Siyeh Glacier – ; 
 Sperry Glacier – ; 
 Swiftcurrent Glacier – ; 
 Thunderbird Glacier – ; 
 Two Ocean Glacier – ; 
 Vulture Glacier – ; 
 Weasel Collar Glacier – ; 
 Whitecrow Glacier – ;

See also
 Mountains and mountain ranges of Glacier National Park (U.S.)

Notes

Further reading 
 

Glacier National Park
Glaciers